Edward Redliński (born 1 May 1940 in Frampol, Poland) is a Polish novelist, publicist and dramatist.

Redliński studied geodesy and cartography at the Warsaw University of Technology, and at the College of Journalism at Warsaw University. He works as a journalist.

Author of humorous and ironic novels and stories about conflict between civilization progress and traditional provincial mentality, among others: Listy z Rabarbaru (1967), Awans (1973), Konopielka (1973), Dolorado (1985), Szczuropolacy (1994), Krfotok (1998).

References 

1940 births
Living people
Polish male writers
Warsaw University of Technology alumni
University of Warsaw alumni
Artists from Białystok
International Writing Program alumni
Recipient of the Meritorious Activist of Culture badge